No Self Control is the fourth full-length release from The Planet Smashers. This album has spawned many fan favorites, including "Blind" and "SK8 or Die". This is only the second album by The Planet Smashers (and first since their self-titled debut) where the album isn't named after its opening track: "No Self Control" is the second track.

Track listing
 "Fabricated"  – 2:43
 "No Self Control"  – 3:45
 "Wish I Were American"  – 3:07
 "Evaluation Day"  – 1:43
 "Blind"  – 2:27
 "Stupid Present"  – 2:36
 "Struggle"  – 2:40
 "It's Over"  – 4:02
 "Hey Hey"  – 2:29
 "Goin' Out"  – 2:47
 "Record Collector"  – 2:17
 "She's Late"  – 2:30
 "Rambler"  – 1:58
 "SK8 or Die"  – 2:23

2001 albums
The Planet Smashers albums